Percival is a small unincorporated community and census-designated place in Fremont County, Iowa, United States. As of the 2010 census, it had a population of 87.

The old part of town is along the BNSF tracks and is accessible from Interstate 29 at Exit 15. However, most sources of employment are located near the Interstate 29/Iowa Highway 2 interchange at Exit 10 of Interstate 29. The ZIP code for Percival is 51648. Mayor, Ethan Peters.

Demographics

References

Census-designated places in Iowa
Census-designated places in Fremont County, Iowa